The 2021–22 Skeleton World Cup was a multi-race series over a season for skeleton. The season started on 19 November 2021 at Innsbruck-Igls, Austria, and finished at St. Moritz, Switzerland on 14 January 2022.

Calendar 
Below is the schedule of the 2021/22 season.

Results

Men

Women

Standings

Men

Women

Medal table

Points

References 

Skeleton World Cup
2021 in skeleton
2022 in skeleton